Dolphin Lighthouse (or Dolphin Rock Light) is one of the three lighthouses in the Mumbai harbour off the coast of Mumbai, India. It is near the Gateway of India and is controlled by the Indian Navy.

To honour military personnel, a 21 gun salute is held every time a warship sails out of the Mumbai harbour with The Admiral of The Fleet.

This lighthouse is also illuminated during Navy Day celebrations which happen during the first week of December every year.

See also 

 List of lighthouses in India

References

External links 
 
 Directorate General of Lighthouses and Lightships
 Picture of Dolphin Lighthouse

Lighthouses in India
Buildings and structures in Mumbai
Transport in Mumbai
Lighthouses completed in 1850